Erketu (meaning "Erketü Tengri") is a genus of somphospondylan sauropod dinosaur that lived in Asia during the Late Cretaceous roughly between 96 million and 89 million years ago. Its fossils were found in Mongolia between 2002 and 2003 during a field expedition and first described in 2006; later on in 2010 due to some cervicals that were left behind in the expedition. Erketu represents one of the first sauropods described from the Bayan Shireh Formation. The elongated cervical vertebrae of Erketu indicates that it was the sauropod with the longest neck relative to its body size.

Discovery and naming
The first remains of Erketu were found back in 2002 by the American Museum of Natural History–Mongolian Academy of Sciences expedition conducted in Mongolia. The team discovered the outcrops of the new locality Bor Guvé, which overlies the Khara Kuthul locality and therefore is referable to the Bayan Shireh Formation. The unearthed specimen, IGM 100/1803, was found in exposure at the sediments of Bor Guvé, mainly composed by sandstone and interbedded grey siltstones, suggesting a fluvial environment that is consistent with the Bayan Shireh Formation. Collected elements are mainly represented by cervical vertebrae and postcranial remains, such as the partial right sternum, tibia and fibula with astragalus and calcaneum.

The remains became the holotype for the new genus and species Erketu ellisoni, first described in 2006 by Daniel Ksepka and Mark Norell of the American Museum of Natural History. The generic name of this particular sauropod species is named after the creator god (tengri) of the Mongolian shamanism, Erketü. The specific name, ellisoni, is in honor to the American Museum of Natural History's senior principal paleoartist, and close friend of Norell: Mick Ellison. In 2003 the team returned to the site and recovered three additional cervicals that were left behind during the first field expedition, and consequently described in 2010.

Description

Its neck was estimated to be twice as long as its body, which may be a record for neck to body ratio. The exact ratio is unknown, because no dorsal vertebrae of E. ellisoni have been reported, although some hindlimb material suggests the approximate size of the body. The long neck of Erketu is the result of the individual vertebrae being greatly elongated; it is unknown if the number of cervical vertebrae was increased. Erketu is also diagnosed by bifurcate anterior cervical neural spines, another unusual trait for a titanosauriform. The preserved cervicals include the atlas, axis and C3 to C9, however, the sixth is missing, giving a total of eight preserved cervical vertebrae.

The right hindlimb elements were nicely found in articulation and they resemble those of Gobititan.

Classification
The phylogenetic analysis of sauropods performed by its describers indicates that Erketu is a basal somphospondylian (the clade of all macronarians closer to titanosaurs than to brachiosaurids), and is most closely related to Titanosauria, being a close relative of Euhelopus.

During the description of Europatitan in 2017, a new cladistic analysis was performed. Here, Erketu was recovered in a polytomy along Chubutisaurus within the Somphospondyli:

Paleoecology

The remains of Erketu are attributed to the Bayan Shireh Formation, which is believed to have been dominated by fluvial and lacrustine environments, such as large meanders and lakes but also a notorious semi-arid climate. The age is estimated to be around 95.9 ± 6.0 million to 89.6 ± 4.0 million years ago, Cenomanian to Santonian epochs. Here, Erketu lived alongside diverse dinosaur fauna, such as the predators Achillobator and potentially Alectrosaurus, the abundant hadrosauroid Gobihadros, heavy armored Talarurus and Tsagantegia, and the well-known therizinosaurs Erlikosaurus and Segnosaurus. The locality of Erketu has also yielded an indeterminate/unnamed titanosaur and very abundant fossilized fruits. Some ecological niches were filled by several dinosaurs, such as the browsers Erlikosaurus, Segnosaurus and Tsagantegia; in contrast, Talarurus was a grazer. Erketu in the other hand, due to its very long neck, was likely a high browser.

See also

 Mark Norell
 Sauropod neck posture

References

Late Cretaceous dinosaurs of Asia
Fossil taxa described in 2006
Fossils of Mongolia
Macronarians
Taxa named by Mark Norell